George Meads (7 July 1797 at Lindfield, Sussex – 30 July 1881 at Brighton, Sussex) was an English professional cricketer who played first-class cricket from 1825 to 1836.  He was mainly associated with Sussex and made 14 known appearances in first-class matches.

References

External links

Bibliography
 Arthur Haygarth, Scores & Biographies, Volume 1-2 (1744–1840), Lillywhite, 1862

1797 births
1881 deaths
English cricketers
English cricketers of 1787 to 1825
English cricketers of 1826 to 1863
Sussex cricketers
People from Lindfield, West Sussex